Shamsher Singh may refer to:
Shamsher Singh (cricketer, born 1972), Indian cricketer  
 Shamsher Singh (cricketer, born 1983), Indian cricketer 
Shamsher Singh (field hockey) (born 1997), Indian field hockey player
Shamsher Bahadur Singh (1913–1993), Indian poet and writer
Shamsher Singh Jolly (1922–1972), Indian Philanthropist

See also